Luigi Conti (2 March 1929 – 5 December 2015) was an Italian prelate of the Catholic Church who spent his career in the diplomatic service of the Holy See. He held the title of archbishop and the rank of nuncio from 1975.

Biography
Conti was born on 2 March 1929 in Ceprano, Province of Frosinone, Italy. He was ordained a priest of the Diocese of Veroli-Frosinone on 29 September 1954. He prepared for a diplomatic career at the Pontifical Ecclesiastical Academy.

He early assignments working in the diplomatic service took him to Indonesia, Venezuela, Belgium, and France. In 1971 he became Permanent Observer of the Holy See to UNESCO in Paris.  

On 1 August 1975, Pope Paul VI named him Apostolic Nuncio to Haiti, Apostolic Delegate to the Antilles, and titular archbishop of Gratiana. He received his episcopal consecration from Cardinal Jean-Marie Villot on 5 October. He defended his newly constructed residence when criticized for its extravagance by Cardinal Aloisio Lorscheider and other prelates who saw it when attending a conference of Latin American bishops  in Port-au-Prince. (The structure survived the earthquake and tsunami of 2010.) He continued as Nuncio to Haiti when Paul Fouad Tabet replaced him as Delegate to the Antilles on 9 February 1980.

On 19 November 1983, he was named Apostolic Pro-Nuncio to Iraq and Kuwait.

On 17 January 1987, he was named Apostolic Nuncio to Ecuador.

On 12 April 1991 he was named Apostolic Nuncio to Honduras.

On 15 May 1999, he was named Apostolic Nuncio to Turkey and Turkmenistan. While he was in that position, Pope John Paul II made the first papal reference to the "Armenian genocide".

On 8 August 2001, he was named Apostolic Nuncio to Malta and Libya.

He retired on 5 June 2003.  He died on 5 December 2015.

References

External links
Catholic Hierarchy: Archbishop Luigi Conti

1929 births
2015 deaths
Italian Roman Catholic archbishops
Pontifical Ecclesiastical Academy alumni
Apostolic Nuncios to Haiti
Apostolic Nuncios to Iraq
Apostolic Nuncios to Kuwait
Apostolic Nuncios to Ecuador
Apostolic Nuncios to Honduras
Apostolic Nuncios to Turkey
Apostolic Nuncios to Turkmenistan
Apostolic Nuncios to Malta
Apostolic Nuncios to Libya